Gaziantep Zoo is a zoo in Gaziantep, Turkey

Location
It is next to the Gaziantep University. Its distance to city center is  Its total area is

History
The zoo was opened on 19 May 2001. The Safari park, a part of the zoo, was opened on 23 April 2015 and on 23 April 2017 a natural history museum was established. Both 19 May and 23 April are national holidays in Turkey.

Species
It  houses 90 species.

There are 82 species of fish (both fresh water and salt water)

Each of the even-toed and odd toed ungulates has its own yard of about 

There are 8 species of primates. 
 
The carnivores such as lion, tiger, puma etc. as well as the reptiles have their summer and winter quarters.

Admission fee
Admission fee is TL 7 for the adults and TL 3.5 for the students and juniors.

Gallery

References

Visitor attractions in Gaziantep
Zoos in Turkey